This is a list of airlines of Europe.

European Union

Austria

Belgium

Bulgaria

Croatia

Cyprus

Czech Republic

Denmark

Estonia

Finland

France

Germany

Greece

Hungary

Ireland

Italy

Latvia

Lithuania

Luxembourg

Malta

Netherlands

Poland

Portugal

Romania

Slovakia

Slovenia

Spain

Sweden

Albania

Armenia

Azerbaijan

Belarus

Bosnia and Herzegovina

Georgia

Iceland

Moldova

Montenegro

North Macedonia

Norway

Russia

Serbia

Switzerland

Turkey

Ukraine

United Kingdom

Notes 
Microstates
 has no airports
 has no airports
 has only 2 helicopter airlines, Heli Air Monaco and Monacair
 has no airports
 has no airports

Dependencies and other territories
 - List of airlines of Portugal
 has no active airlines
 has only 1 airline, Atlantic Airways
 has no active airlines
 has only 2 airlines, Aurigny and Blue Islands
 - List of airlines of Greenland
 has no active airlines
 has no active airlines
 - List of airlines of Svalbard

States with limited recognition
 has no active airlines
 - has no active airlines
 - List of airlines of Kosovo
 has no active airlines
 has no active airlines
 has no active airlines

See also 
 List of airlines
 List of defunct airlines of Europe
 List of largest airlines in Europe

Due to the size of the list it has been broken down into: